The Legend of Tarzan may refer to:

The Legend of Tarzan (TV series), 2001
The Legend of Tarzan (film), 2016

See also
Tarzan for the character
 Tarzan (franchise)
Tarzan in film and other non-print media for other cinematic depictions